Flagellaria is the sole genus in the flowering plant family Flagellariaceae with only five species. The family has historically been recognized by few taxonomists. The APG II system, of 2003 (unchanged from the APG system, 1998), does recognize such a family, and assigns it to the order Poales in the clade commelinids, in the monocots.

Flagellaria consists of only five known species, found in the tropical and subtropical regions of Asia, Africa, Australia, and various island of the Pacific and Indian Oceans.

List of species
 Flagellaria collaris  Wepfer & H.P.Linder - Fiji
 Flagellaria gigantea  Hook.f. - New Guinea, Solomon Islands, Samoa, Niue, Fiji, New Guinea
 Flagellaria guineensis Schumach. - tropical and southern Africa, Madagascar, Sri Lanka
 Flagellaria indica L. - Asia, Papuasia, Australia, Micronesia, Madagascar, Seychelles, Mauritius, Réunion, Rodrigues Island, Mozambique, Tanzania
 Flagellaria neocaledonica Schltr. - Solomon Islands, New Caledonia

References

External links

 Flagellariaceae in L. Watson and M.J. Dallwitz (1992 onwards). The families of flowering plants: descriptions, illustrations, identification, information retrieval. Version: 27 April 2006. https://web.archive.org/web/20060424062016/http://delta-intkey.com/ 
 Monocot families (USDA)
 Flagellariaceae in Flora of China
 Florabase (western Australia) 
 NCBI Taxonomy Browser
 links at CSDL

Poales genera
Poales